Holley is an English surname. 
It is either locational, ultimately derived an Old English hol lēah "[dwelling by] the clearing by the hollow", or descriptive, from hol-ēage "hollow-eyed".

Notable people with the surname include:

Addison Holley (born 2000), Canadian actress
Alexander H. Holley (1804–1887), American politician
Alexander Lyman Holley (1832–1882), mechanical engineer
Charles Hardin Holley, real name of singer Buddy Holly (1936–1959)
Bernard Holley (1940–2021), British actor
Candice Holley (born 1981), American basketball player
George Holley (1885–1942), England international footballer
Horace Holley (minister) (1781–1827), Unitarian minister and president of Transylvania University
Horace Holley (Baháʼí) (1887–1960), prominent follower of the Bahá'í Faith
James W. Holley III (1926–2012), American politician
John M. Holley (1802–1848), American politician
Kerrie Holley, American software architect
Lonnie Holley (born 1950), American artist
Martin Holley (born 1954), American Roman Catholic bishop
Marietta Holley (1836–1926), American humorist
Mary Austin Holley (1784–1846), American historical writer
Michael Holley (born 1970), American sports commentator
Myron Holley (1779–1841), American politician
Orville L. Holley (1791–1861), American politician
Robert Holley (disambiguation), several people
Sallie Holley (1818–1893), American educator and anti-slavery activist
Sam Holley, American baseball umpire

See also
Holly (name)

References